Magic Forest is a common name for Lake George Expedition Park in New York.

Magic Forest may also refer to:

Magic Forest (album), a 2014 album by Amberian Dawn
"Magic Forest", a song by Fat Mattress from their 1969 self-titled debut album